Ukraine was the host of the Junior Eurovision Song Contest 2009, held at the Palace of Sports in Kyiv. NTU has held a national final to select the fourth Ukrainian entry for the Junior Eurovision Song Contest.

Before Junior Eurovision

National final 
NTU held a national final to select the Ukrainian entry to the JESC 2009. From the 70 accepted entries received by NTU for the contest, a professional jury selected 32 to compete in a pre-recorded semi-final on 14 May 2009. The members of the jury were Roman Nedzelskiy (vice-president of NTU), Mihaylo Chemberzhi (director of the Kyiv Youth Academy of Arts), Natalia Efimenko (vocal tutor of the Kyiv Music Academy) Victor Knysh (director of representative office of Artek in Kyiv and staging director of the national final), Olexander Zlotnik (composer), Marina Modina (singer) and Nadya Atonasova (head of dance studio "A6").

Semi-final 
At the semi-final on 14 May 2009, 15 entries were selected by the jury to progress to the live final on 14 June 2009.

Final 
The final, attended by Prime Minister of Ukraine Yulia Tymoshenko, took place on 14 June 2009 at the International Children's Centre 'Artek' in Kyiv, and was hosted by commentator for Eurovision and Junior Eurovision Timur Miroshnychenko and three-time participant at the Ukrainian Junior national final Marietta. Fifteen competing acts participated in the televised production where the winner was determined by a 50/50 combination of both public telephone vote and the votes of jury members made up of music professionals. Andranik Alexanyan was selected to represent Ukraine with the song "Try topoli, try surmy". Only the televoting results were revealed, which Olexander Chernenko won. Andranik Alexanyan came second and Liza Malaeva came in third.

The members of the jury that voted in the final were Vasil Ilaschuk (president of NTU), Yuriy Pavlenko (Minister for Family, Youth and Sports Affairs), Vasil Vovkun (Minister for Culture and Tourism Affairs), Mihaylo Chemberzhi (director of the Kyiv Youth Academy of Arts), Olexander Zlotnik (composer), Boris Novozhilov (director of the International Children's Centre 'Artek'), Marina Modina (singer) and Vasyl Lazarovych (singer).

At Eurovision

Voting

Notes

References

External links 
  NTU website

Ukraine
Junior Eurovision Song Contest
2009

ru:Украина на детском конкурсе песни Евровидение 2009